The Congregation of the Annunciation (Congregatio Annuntiationis B.M.V.), formerly known as the Belgian Congregation, is a congregation of monasteries within the Roman Catholic Benedictine Confederation. Founded in 1920, the Congregation includes fifteen independent male monasteries spread throughout ten countries. Additionally, two female monasteries are members of the Congregation, while a further ten are affiliated with the Congregation.

History

In 1920, the Belgian Congregation of the Annunciation was founded by three of the great abbeys of Belgium: St. Andrew's Abbey in Bruges, Keizersberg Abbey, and Maredsous Abbey. These monasteries shared descent from the Abbey of Beuron. Their respective abbots, Theodore Neve, Robert de Kerchove, and Columba Marmion, chose to unite their communities into a new congregation.

Yet even before its inception, the international character of the Annunciation Congregation was nascent. Gerard van Caloen, founder of St. Andrew's Abbey, dreamed of reviving the missionary apostolate of such early Benedictines as Boniface, Apostle of the Germans. While acting as the Beuronese Congregation's procurator in Rome, Van Caloen saw that the Brazilian Congregation was in need of assistance. Thus, in 1898, he facilitated the foundation of St. Andrew's Abbey as a procura for monastic restoration. Upon being raised to an abbey in 1901, St. Andrew's Abbey was incorporated into the Brazilian Congregation, but was detached from it in 1920 to form the Congregation of the Annunciation.

Under Van Caloen's successor, Abbot Theodore Neve, the monks of St. Andrew's Abbey established mission stations in the Belgian Congo. The abbey would go on to create monastic foundations in China, India, Poland, the United States, and Zaïre. Likewise, Maredsous established an Irish foundation in 1927, which in turn has expanded to Nigeria. The Polish community at Tyniec near Krakow has founded two additional houses in Poland, and one in Slovakia.

Over the years, the Annunciation Congregation has also expanded by incorporating previously existing abbeys. Thus, the Abbey of St Matthias (Germany), Egmond Abbey (Netherlands), the Abbey of Our Lady of Exile (Trinidad and Tobago), and St Benedict's Abbey, Singeverga (Portugal) have contributed their mature monastic communities to the Congregation.

In 1968, the monastery of Mont César, Louvain (Belgium) withdrew from the Congregation to join the Flemish Province of the Subiaco Congregation.

Governance
Under the Constitutions of the Congregation of the Annunciation, canonical visitations of member houses are conducted four years. Likewise, the General Chapter convenes every four years. The General Chapter, organized at one of the Congregation's European abbeys, brings together a superior and an elected delegate from each of the Congregation's monasteries.

The Abbot President of the Congregation of the Annunciation is Father Ansgar Schmidt, former superior of the Abbey of St Matthias, Trier. The Abbot President is elected every eight years.

List of member houses and "dependencies"
Member houses and dependencies:

Africa
 Simple Priory B.M.V. a Victoriis, Luena, Angola
Monastère Notre-Dame-des-Sources (1944), Lubumbashi, Democratic Republic of the Congo
 St. Benedict's Priory (1979), Ewu-Ishan, Nigeria
 Priory Notre-Dame de L'Annonciation, Sovu, Rwanda
 Cella de Kigufi, Kigufi, Rwanda

Americas
Abbey of Our Lady of Exile (1912), Tunapuna, Trinidad and Tobago
St. Andrew's Abbey (1956), Valyermo, California

Asia
 Abbey of the Dormition, Jerusalem

Europe
Monastère Saint-Remacle (1950), Wavreumont, Belgium
Monasterio de la Resurreccion, Chucuito, (1992), Peru (founded from Wavreumont)
 (1970), Ottignies, Belgium
Prieuré de Mambre (1978), Kinshasa, Democratic Republic of the Congo
Abbaye de Maredsous (1872), Denée
 Simple Priory des SS. Pierre et Paul, (1958), Gihindamuyaga, Rwanda
Sint-Andriesadbdij Zevenkerken (1902), Sint-Andries, Belgium
 Asirvanam Priory, Bangalore, India
 St Thomas Benedictine Monastery, (1988), Kappadu
 Abadia de S. Bento de Singeverga, Porto, Portugal
Mosteiro de S. Bento da Vitoria, Porto, Portugal
Colegio de Lamego, Lamego, Portugal
Prieuré Saint-Benoit (1988), Étiolles, France
Benediktinerabtei St. Matthias, Trier, Germany
Benediktinerpriorat Huysburg
Glenstal Abbey (1927), Murroe, Ireland
Sint Adelbert Abdij (1935), Egmond, Netherlands
Opactwo Benedyktynow (1044), Tyniec, Poland
Klasztor Zwiastowania (1987), Biskupów
Kláštor Premenenia Pána (2010), Sampor, Slovakia
 Priory Nativitatis B.M.V. (1923), Lubin
 Abbey de la Paix Notre-Dame, Liege, Belgium

Affiliates
 Home Casa de Huambo, Angola
 Abbey Sainte-Gertrude, Belgium
 Conventual Priory of Our Lady Van Bethanie, Loppem, Belgium
 Conventual Priory de L'Alliance
 Priory Notre-Dame, Ermeton-Sur-Biert, Belgium

Benedictine nuns
 l’Abbaye des saints Jean et Scolastique, Maredret, Belgium

Affiliates
 Ermeton Abbey, Belgium

See also
Order of Saint Benedict
Benedictine Confederation

References

External links
 Congregation website

Benedictine congregations
Christian organizations established in 1920